Buisson is a commune in the Vaucluse department in the Provence-Alpes-Côte d'Azur region in southeastern France.

Buisson is a small, wine-producing, Knights Templar village, dating back at least as far as the 12th century, and linked since its beginning to the nearby village of Villedieu, with which it produces its principal crop, Côtes-du-Rhône wine, which is sold from their joint winery, le Cellier du Templier.

Geography
Situated above the Aygues River, Buisson lies at the northern edge of the Vaucluse and within sight of the southern border of the Drôme, the département immediately to its north. Located 9 km (5 mi) northwest of the small, ancient city of Vaison-la-Romaine, known as "the French Pompeii," Buisson is one of fourteen communes surrounding that city that share its postal address: 84110 Vaison-la-Romaine.

Economy
Besides its wine, Buisson produces in small quantities such products as olives, apricots, cherries, figs, lavender, and numerous other vegetables and fruits. It is situated above the same valley as Nyons, the ancient olive capital of France, and within an hour's drive of the Mediterranean, from which fresh-caught seafood is brought to neighboring markets at Vaison, Valréas, Nyons, Malaucène, and Tulette, as well as to the nearby cities of Carpentras, Orange, Avignon, and L'Isle-sur-la-Sorgue.

Sights
Buisson, whose population rises to approximately 360 inhabitants in summer, is a pretty, typically Provençal village, whose annual wine fête occurs in July. Its physical attractions include an intact, inner medieval walled section with two entrances, one of which housed a 14th-century portcullis; a church dating from at least the 12th  century, Notre Dame Del Bois, whose northern yard affords views of the entire region; and two lavoirs, one, on its main plaza, with an attractive fountain. The site of Buisson's medieval castle now includes a large residence, which was constructed several centuries after the original structure disappeared.

See also
Communes of the Vaucluse department

References

Communes of Vaucluse